Doetinchem Stadion was a stop on the Winterswijk–Zevenaar railway in Doetinchem, Netherlands. It was for spectators going to the De Graafschap football club's De Vijverberg stadium. It was opened in 1992 and was only used for important matches. It closed in 2005, but the platform still exists.

Railway stations in Doetinchem
1992 establishments in the Netherlands
2005 disestablishments in the Netherlands
Railway stations in the Netherlands opened in the 20th century